Made in England may refer to:

 Products made in England; see Manufacturing in the United Kingdom
 Made in England (Elton John album), 1995
 "Made in England" (song), by Elton John
 Made in England (Atomic Rooster album), 1972
 Made in England (The Adicts album), 2005
 Made in England / Gentle Dreams, a 2003 album by Julian Lloyd Webber

See also
 Made in Britain